Timbang Langkat is a village (kelurahan) in East Binjai, Binjai, North Sumatra, Indonesia. The postal code is 20 732.

Binjai